Toxic vacuolation, also known as toxic vacuolization, is the formation of vacuoles in the cytoplasm of neutrophils in response to severe infections or inflammatory conditions.

Clinical significance
Toxic vacuolation is associated with sepsis, particularly when accompanied by toxic granulation. The finding is also associated with bacterial infection, alcohol toxicity, liver failure, and treatment with granulocyte colony-stimulating factor, a cytokine drug used to increase the absolute neutrophil count in patients with neutropenia.

The formation of toxic vacuoles represents increased phagocytic activity, which is stimulated by the release of cytokines in response to inflammation or tissue injury. Toxic vacuolation frequently occurs in conjunction with toxic granulation and Döhle bodies in inflammatory states, and these findings are collectively referred to as toxic changes. Neutrophilia and left shift (the presence of immature neutrophil precursors such as band neutrophils and metamyelocytes in the peripheral blood) often accompany toxic changes, as these phenomena also occur in response to inflammation.

It has been suggested that neutrophil vacuoles not be labelled "toxic vacuoles" unless they are accompanied by other toxic changes, as vacuolation can occur in other conditions.

Similar conditions
Vacuoles may form in neutrophils if a blood sample is left standing for several hours prior to blood smear preparation, but this is an artifactual change with no clinical significance. Artifactual vacuoles are small and of uniform size and distribution, in contrast to toxic vacuoles whose size and placement are variable. Individuals with neutral lipid storage disease may exhibit persistent lipid-filled vacuoles in neutrophils and other granulocytes, which is a distinct phenomenon termed Jordans' anomaly.

See also
 Leukemoid reaction
 Acute phase reaction

References

Histopathology
Hematology
Hematopathology
Abnormal clinical and laboratory findings for blood